Thyge Thøgersen (4 November 1926 – 18 February 2016) was a Danish long-distance runner. He competed at the 1952, 1956 and the 1960 Summer Olympics, placing 6th in the 1960 marathon and 8th at 5000 metres in 1956.

References

External links
 

1926 births
2016 deaths
Athletes (track and field) at the 1952 Summer Olympics
Athletes (track and field) at the 1956 Summer Olympics
Athletes (track and field) at the 1960 Summer Olympics
Danish male long-distance runners
Danish male marathon runners
Olympic athletes of Denmark